Promno Landscape Park (Park Krajobrazowy Promno) is a protected area (Landscape Park) in west-central Poland.

The Park lies within Greater Poland Voivodeship, in Poznań County (in the district of Gmina Pobiedziska). It takes its name from the village of Promno.

Promno
Parks in Greater Poland Voivodeship